Drug courts are judicially supervised court dockets that provide a sentencing alternative of treatment combined with supervision for people living with serious substance use. Drug courts are problem-solving courts that take a public health approach using a specialized model in which the judiciary, prosecution, defense bar, probation, law enforcement, mental health, social service, and treatment communities work together to help addicted offenders into long-term recovery.

By country

Australia

In Australia, drug courts operate in various jurisdictions, although their formation, process and procedures differ. The main aim of the Australian courts is to divert illicit drug users from incarceration into treatment programs for their addiction. Drug courts have been established in New South Wales, Queensland, South Australia, Victoria, and Western Australia. People appearing in Australian drug courts often fall outside the parameters for other pre-court services

Canada
Drug treatment courts (DTCs) are a recent phenomenon in the Canadian criminal justice system. The first Canadian DTC commenced in Toronto in 1998. The Federal Government currently supports  Edmonton (December 2005), Winnipeg (January 2006), Ottawa (March 2006), Regina (October 2006), Toronto (1998), and Vancouver (2001). Hamilton, Calgary and Durham have also recently initiated DTCs.

New Zealand
A five-year pilot Alcohol and Other Drug Treatment Court was opened in Auckland, New Zealand, in 2012, the first of its type for the country. Since the pilot was established, 46% of participants have graduated. According to the New Zealand Drug Foundation, this rate is six times higher than that achieved by most ‘voluntary’ rehabilitation programmes.  Graduates were 62% less likely to reoffend and 71% less likely to return to prison in the first 12 months after treatment  When non-graduates were included in the analysis, 54% (of participants overall) were less likely to reoffend and 58% less likely to go back to prison in the following 12 months.

United Kingdom
In the UK, drug courts are currently being tested in various places. In December 2005, the United Kingdom began a pilot scheme of dedicated drug courts. Family Drug and Alcohol Court are in operation in various locations throughout the country, including London, Gloucestershire and Milton Keynes where the service is run by the Tavistock and Portman NHS Foundation Trust.  In February 2015 it was announced that more would open in East Sussex, Kent and Medway, Plymouth, Torbay and Exeter, and West Yorkshire.

United States

The first drug court in the US took shape in Miami-Dade County, Florida in 1989 as a response to the growing crack cocaine problem plaguing the city. Chief Judge Gerald Wetherington, Judge Herbert Klein, then State Attorney Janet Reno, and Public Defender Bennett Brummer designed the court for nonviolent offenders to receive treatment. In the United States, according to the National Association of Drug Court Professionals, as of December 31, 2014, there are 3,057 drug courts representing all 50 states, the District of Columbia, Guam, Puerto Rico, Northern Mariana Islands, and various tribal regions.

Effectiveness in the United States 

Drug courts are often touted as the single most successful intervention in US history for leading people struggling with serious addiction out of the justice system and into lives of health and long-term recovery. One study shows that 70% of those who are sent to prison rather than a drug court return to drug use following release. Oftentimes, drug courts are the only avenue for entry into treatment in the United States for those who do not have sufficient financial resources to pay for their own treatment. While the average national completion rate for drug court participants in one study was nearly 60% (two-thirds higher than probation and more than twice the rate of probationers with severe substance use disorders) different courts will show different outcomes. There is also some evidence of reduced recidivism through drug courts.

Drug courts are a relatively new form of sanction in the justice system with roots that date back to earlier centuries. Drug courts are meant to keep offenders in the community instead of in jail or prison. Drug court is assigned by a judge if they believe the offender is a good candidate for treatment and that the community would be better served through this route. Drug court is often the sanction imposed as a result of a plea bargain. As long as the offender successfully completes drug court, the offense is sealed from public record. Drug Court is completed along with probation, with mandatory drug and alcohol urine analysis, treatment programs, counseling, mandatory work, and often educational training.

As a result of what are deemed good outcomes, a variety of court programs are now focused on treatment rather than incarceration for repeat DWI offenders, parents whose children have been removed from the home due to substance use, juveniles facing criminal charges, tribal communities torn apart by addiction, and veterans struggling with the lingering effects of trauma. These programs seek to lead people into recovery and to break the cycle of recidivism.

Women and drug courts in United States
There are many variations to drug courts and more recently some have opened up to deal specifically with women drug users. Some even treat women who engage in prostitution because of their drug addiction.

Juvenile drug courts in the United States 
Drug courts also exist to treat juveniles with substance abuse issues. They work similar to adult drug courts but are tailored to meet the needs of children.

Drug courts in the news 
Drug courts have had many successful graduates. They have bi-partisan support in the political arena.

See also
DWI court
Veterans treatment court

References

Further reading 
  This discussion paper is based on the deliberations of a group of international experts present at a scientific workshop held at Vienna in October 2009, called Voluntary-based or compulsory drug dependence treatment? From mandated treatment to therapeutic alliance.
 National Association of Drug Court Professionals (2013-2015). Adult Drug Court Best Practice Standards, Volumes I and II.

Courts by type
Drug rehabilitation